Olanda Anderson (born November 16, 1972) is an American former boxer best known for being a member of the 2000 United States Olympic Team as a light heavyweight.

Background
Born in Sumter, South Carolina, Anderson became a U.S. Army Staff Sergeant.

Amateur career
Anderson was the National Amateur Light Heavyweight Champion in 1998 and 2000.

Olympic results
 1st round bye
 Lost to Rudolf Kraj (Czech Republic) 13-14

Professional career
Anderson turned pro in 2002 and was undefeated in the only two recorded bouts of his career.  Both bouts were one week apart in January 2002.

External links
 

1972 births
Living people
Sportspeople from Sumter, South Carolina
African-American boxers
Boxers from South Carolina
Heavyweight boxers
Light-heavyweight boxers
Olympic boxers of the United States
Boxers at the 2000 Summer Olympics
Winners of the United States Championship for amateur boxers
American male boxers
21st-century African-American sportspeople
20th-century African-American sportspeople
U.S. Army World Class Athlete Program